Christine Apolot is a Ugandan teacher and politician. She was the local counsel five(LC5) chair for Kumi District. She was elected to that position in June 2016.  In 2021 she contested as the women's representative Member of Parliament for Kumi District under the National Resistance Movement party challenging Amoding Monicah.

Background and education 
Apolot was born from Kumi District. She attained a first class degree in Education from Kumi University. She also has a Certificate in Administrative law from the Law Development Centre(LDC). As of March 2021, she is pursuing a post graduate degree in Public administration at Uganda Management Institute(UMI).

Career 
Apolot started her career as a secondary school teacher, then she joined politics in 2016 under the National Resistance Movement(NRM) party as the Local Council 5 chairperson (LC5) in Kumi District. She became not only the first woman to occupy the seat in teso sub-region but one of the three women nationally to become LC5 chairpersons in Uganda. Currently she is the Women's Representative Member of Parliament elect for Kumi District in Uganda's 11th parliament.

References 

Living people
Year of birth missing (living people)
Ugandan politicians
21st-century Ugandan women politicians
21st-century Ugandan politicians
Teso people